Oceangate, Ocean Gate, or variation, may refer to:

 Ocean Gate, New Jersey, USA
 Ocean Gate School District
 Ocean Gate Elementary School, see Ocean Gate School District
 Oceangate Tower, Meridian Quay, Swansea, Wales, UK
 OceanGate, Inc., submarine company

See also

 Watergate (architecture)
 Gate (water transport)
 
 
 
 
 Ocean (disambiguation)
 Gate (disambiguation)
 Seagate (disambiguation)
 Watergate (disambiguation)